Asheqan may refer to:
 Asheqan, Hormozgan
 Asheqan-e Abedin, Kermanshah Province
 Asheqan-e Musa, Kermanshah Province
 Asheqan, Mashhad, Razavi Khorasan Province
 Asheqan, Rashtkhvar, Razavi Khorasan Province
 Asheqan, Sistan and Baluchestan